Uttar Pradesh Day  also referred to as UP Diwas or Uttar Pradesh Diwas in Hindi, is celebrated as foundation day of Indian state, Uttar Pradesh. It is observed on 24 January.

History 
On 24 January 1950, the United Provinces was renamed as Uttar Pradesh. In May 2017, the Government of Uttar Pradesh declared to celebrate UP Day on 24 January every year. The celebration of UP Day was proposed by the governor Ram Naik.

See also 

 History of Uttar Pradesh

References

Culture of Uttar Pradesh
January observances
Indian state foundation days
History of Uttar Pradesh (1947–present)